Kalmykov is a Slavic masculine surname, its feminine counterpart is Kalmykova. It is most common in Belarus, Russia and Ukraine. It was a satirical name given to Slavs who visited or lived Kalmykia to trade goods. It was also common amongst Slavic Cossacks.
Ivan Kalmykov (1890–1920), Ataman of the Ussuri Cossacks during the Russian Civil War.
Maria Kalmykova (born 1978), Russian basketball player 
Sergey Kalmykov (1891–1967), Russian painter, draughtsman and writer
Tatyana Kalmykova (born 1990), Russian race walker
Vadim Kalmykov, Ukrainian Paralympic track and field athlete

Russian-language surnames